DYRJ (100.3 FM) is a relay station of RJFM Manila, owned and operated by Rajah Broadcasting Network through its licensee Free Air Broadcasting Network, Inc. The station's studio and transmitter are located at the 10th Floor, Ludo and Luym Bldg., Plaridel St., Cebu City.

History
The station was established in 1987 as RJFM. At that time, it aired an album rock format, similar to its former AM station in Manila. In 1996, it changed its name to Boss Radio. In 2000, it rebranded as The Hive and switched to a modern rock format. In 2003, it became a relay station of RJ 100.3 with limited local advertising.

On December 16, 2021, the station went off the air after its building and transmitter in Ludo and Luym Bldg. Plaridel St. were destroyed by Typhoon Rai (Odette), together with 106.7 Home Radio's transmitter site and 107.5 Win Radio. Its transmitter tower was struck by the said typhoon. In February 2022, it went back on the air after the power was restored in the building.

References

Radio stations in Metro Cebu
Radio stations established in 1987